Piperic acid is a chemical often obtained by the base-hydrolysis of the alkaloid piperine from black pepper, followed by acidification of the corresponding salt. Piperic acid is an intermediate in the synthesis of other compounds such as piperonal, and as-such may be used to produce fragrances, perfumes flavorants and drugs as well as other useful compounds.

Preparation
Piperic acid can be prepared from the commercially-available alkaloid piperine, a cyclic amide containing a piperidine group, by reacting it with a hydroxide such as potassium hydroxide, then acidifying the formed piperate salt with hydrochloric acid or another acid. The toxic compound piperidine is given off during the base-hydrolysis of piperine and as-such, safety precautions should be taken.

Reactions
Reaction of piperic acid with strong oxidizers such as potassium permanganate or ozone, or a halogen such as bromine followed by sodium hydroxide causes oxidative cleavage of the double-bonds, yielding piperonal and piperonylic acid. Piperonal has many uses in industry and is itself a precursor to a good subsection of other chemicals. On reduction with sodium amalgam piperic acid forms α- and β-dihydropiperic acid, C12H12O4, and the latter can take up two further atoms of hydrogen to produce tetrahydropiperic acid.

See also
Piperonal
Piperine
Safrole
Isosafrole
Sesamol
Piperonyl butoxide
Cinnamic acid

References

Carboxylic acids
Benzodioxoles